Robert Haworth (1801 – 21 December 1875) was an English-born Australian politician.

He was born at Bury in Lancashire to Richard Haworth and Lizzie Burch. He married Alice Whittaker around 1822, with whom he had eight children; a second marriage on 7 October 1854 to Thirza Tapp Webber produced a further four children. He migrated to Australia around 1835. In 1860 he was elected to the New South Wales Legislative Assembly for Illawarra, but he did not re-contest in 1864. Haworth died at Wollongong in 1875.

References

 

1801 births
1875 deaths
Members of the New South Wales Legislative Assembly
19th-century Australian politicians
People from Bury, Greater Manchester